ClamWin Free Antivirus is a free and open-source antivirus tool for Windows. It provides a graphical user interface to the Clam AntiVirus engine.

Features 
 Scanning scheduler (only effective with user logged in).
 Automatic virus database updates on a regular basis.
 Standalone virus-scanner.
 Context menu integration for Windows Explorer.
 Add-in for Microsoft Outlook.
 A portable version that can be used from a USB flash drive.

There are Firefox extensions that allow the users to process downloaded files with ClamWin.

Real-time scanning 
ClamWin Free Antivirus scans on demand; it does not automatically scan files as they are read and written.

The non-affiliated projects Clam Sentinel and Winpooch are add-ons that provide a real-time scanning capability to ClamWin.

Updates 
ClamWin Free Antivirus has a virus database which is updated automatically when it detects connection to the Internet. A small balloon tip appears on the taskbar icon indicating completion status of the update process. It retries to establish connection with the server if it fails to download the updates first time.

Effectiveness 

Historically ClamWin Free Antivirus has suffered from poor detection rates and its scans have been slow and less effective than some other antivirus programs. For example, in 2009 ClamWin Free Antivirus failed to detect almost half of the trojan horses, password stealers, and other malware in AV-TEST's "zoo" of malware samples.

In the 1–21 June 2008 test performed by Virus.gr, ClamWin Free Antivirus version 0.93 detected 54.68% of all threats and ranked 37th out of 49 products tested; the best scored over 99%.

In the 10 August-05 September 2009 test performed by Virus.gr, ClamWin Free Antivirus version 0.95.2 detected 52.48% of all threats and ranked 43 out of 55 products tested; the best scored 98.89%.

On 6 September 2011 cNet gave ClamWin Free Antivirus a rating of excellent, 4 of 5 stars.

See also 

 List of antivirus software
List of free and open-source software packages
 ClamTk, a similar interface for ClamAV, but for Linux desktop use.

References

External links 

 
 

Antivirus software
Free antivirus software
Free security software
Free software programmed in C++
Free software programmed in Python
Portable software
Windows security software
Windows-only free software